The 1988 Toledo Rockets football team was an American football team that represented the University of Toledo in the Mid-American Conference (MAC) during the 1988 NCAA Division I-A football season. In their seventh season under head coach Dan Simrell, the Rockets compiled a 6–5 record (4–4 against MAC opponents), finished in sixth place in the MAC, and outscored all opponents by a combined total of 244 to 221.

The team's statistical leaders included Steve Keene with 793 passing yards, Neil Trotter with 783 rushing yards, and Rick Isaiah with 389 receiving yards.

Schedule

References

Toledo
Toledo Rockets football seasons
Toledo Rockets football